The Black River is a river in Thurston County in the U.S. state of Washington.

History
The fur trader John Work was the first to describe the Black River in 1824: "The Black River so named from the colour of its water ... A great many dead salmon are in the river, and many that are just alive and barely able to move through the water."

Course
The river flows generally south, through Littlerock, near the Mima Mounds Natural Area Preserve, then southwest, passing through the Black River Habitat Management Area and the town of Rochester, before meandering west through the community of Gate and entering Grays Harbor County, where it empties into the Chehalis River in the Chehalis Indian Reservation.

The Black River Unit of the Nisqually National Wildlife Refuge extends about 5 miles (8 km) along the river immediately south of Black Lake.

See also
 List of rivers in Washington

References

External links

Rivers of Washington (state)
Rivers of Thurston County, Washington